The 2015 Aylesbury Vale District Council election took place on 7 May 2015 to elect members of Aylesbury Vale District Council in Buckinghamshire, England. The whole council was up for election with boundary changes since the last election in 2011. The Conservative Party remained in overall control of the council.

Election result
Overall turnout at the election was 68%.

Ward results

Changes between 2015 and 2019

By-elections

Grendon Underwood and Brill
A by-election was held in Grendon Underwood and Brill on 23 December 2015 after the death of Conservative councillor and former leader of the council John Cartwright. The seat was held for the Conservatives by Cameron Branston with a majority of 51 votes over Liberal Democrat Julian Newman.

Elmhurst
A by-election was held in Elmhurst on 6 April 2017 after the resignation of UK Independence Party councillor Andy Hetherington. The seat was won for the Liberal Democrats by Susan Morgan with a majority of 634 seats over Labour's Gary Andrew Paxton.

Wendover and Halton
A by-election was held in Wendover and Halton on 4 May 2017 after the resignation of Conservative councillor Andrew Southam. This was held alongside the Buckinghamshire County Council election on the same date. The seat was won for the Conservatives by Richard Allan Newcombe with a majority of 823 seats over Labour's Cath Collier.

Central & Walton 
A by-election was held in Central & Walton on 22 March 2018 following the resignation in February of Conservative councillor Edward Sims. The Liberal Democrats' Waheed Raja gained the seat.

Quainton 
A by-election is expected in Quainton following the death of Kevin Hewson (Conservative) in February 2018.

Changes in affiliation 
Tom Hunter-Watts left the Conservative Party and on 5 May 2017 joined the Lib Dems.

On 9 May 2017, all three of UKIP's remaining councillors left the party.

References

2015 English local elections
May 2015 events in the United Kingdom
2015
2010s in Buckinghamshire